Masking can mean:

Arts and media
Backmasking, a recording technique in which a sound or message is recorded backward onto a track meant to be played forward
Masking (art), protecting a selected area from change during production, as with tape and stencils
Masking (illustration), an art technique that influences the intended perception of a character

Data protection
Data masking, replacing data with random characters or data to conceal sensitive information
Blinded experiment, in which data is masked to prevent bias
Masking (Electronic Health Record), patient-requested concealment of information from healthcare providers
Masking and unmasking by intelligence agencies, to protect the privacy of unintentional surveillance targets
Sound masking, intentional introduction of background sounds to improve comfort and privacy

Perception
Auditory masking, sensory phenomena where perception of one sound is affected by another
Temporal masking
Simultaneous masking
Visual masking
Backward masking, in psychovisual or psychoacoustics

Other technologies
Mask (computing), AND'ing or OR'ing a bit pattern with another bit pattern to select certain bits
Masking agent, a reagent used in chemical analysis which reacts with chemical species which may interfere in the analysis
Sound masking, intentional introduction of background sounds to improve comfort and privacy
Spectral mask, a method for reducing adjacent-channel interference in broadcast applications

Other uses
Masking (personality), in which an individual changes their personality to conform to social pressure
Applying or using a facial mask
Female masking, a form of male cross-dressing